The year 1605 in music involved some significant events.

Events
none listed

Publications
Gregor Aichinger – Psalm 50 Miserere mei for eight, nine, ten, eleven, and twelve voices (Munich: Nikolaus Heinrich)
Giammateo Asola – Madrigals for six voices (Venice: Ricciardo Amadino)
Ippolito Baccusi – : second book of madrigals for three voices (Venice: Ricciardo Amadino), contains settings of text from Petrarch's 
Ludovico Balbi – Masses and motets for eight voices (Venice: Angelo Gardano), published posthumously, also includes a Te Deum
Adriano Banchieri
, second book of madrigals for five voices, Op. 12 (Venice: Ricciardo Amadino)
, Op. 13 (Venice: Ricciardo Amadino), a collection of organ music and instructions for playing organ during mass
Giulio Belli –  for eight voices (two choirs with continuo) (Venice: Angelo Gardano)
William Byrd – , book one, for three, four, and five voices (London: Thomas East)
Sethus Calvisius –  for four voices (Leipzig), a setting of the Becker Psalter
Antonio Cifra – First book of madrigals for five voices (Rome: Luigi Zannetti)
Giovanni Croce – Magnificats for eight voices (Venice: Giacomo Vincenti)
Giacomo Finetti –  for five voices (Venice: Ricciardo Amadino), music for Compline
Melchior Franck –  (German Secular Songs and Dances), Part 2, for four voices (Coburg)
Andrea Gabrieli
 (Venice: Angelo Gardano), fifth book of his organ music, published posthumously
 (Venice: Angelo Gardano), sixth and final book of his organ music, published posthumously
Marco da Gagliano – Third book of madrigals for five voices (Venice: Angelo Gardano)
Bartholomäus Gesius –  (Christian House and Table Music) for four voices (Wittenberg: Lorenz Seuberlich for Paul Helwig)
Ruggiero Giovannelli – First book of madrigals for three voices (Venice: Angelo Gardano)
Tobias Hume – The first part of ayres (London: John Windet), a collection of songs accompanied by one or two viols
Johannes Lippius –  (Strasburg)
Duarte Lobo – Magnificat for four voices (Antwerp: Plantin)
Claudio Merulo – Third book of madrigals for six voices (Venice: Angelo Gardano), published posthumously
Simone Molinaro
First book of Magnificats for four voices (Milan: Simon Tini & Filippo Lomazzo)
 for two and four voices (Venice: Ricciardo Amadino)
Claudio Monteverdi –  (Fifth book of madrigals for five voices) (Venice: Ricciardo Amadino)
Benedetto Pallavicino –  (Venice: Ricciardo Amadino)
Francis Pilkington – The first booke of songs or ayres of 4. parts (London: Thomas Este)
Costanzo Porta
 for eight voices (Venice: Angelo Gardano), a collection of vespers psalms for every solemnity along with four Magnificats
Motets for five voices (Venice: Angelo Gardano)
Michael Praetorius – , Part 1
Enrico Antonio Radesca – First book of canzonettas, madrigals and arie alla romana for two voices (Milan: Simon Tini & Filippo Lomazzo)
Tomás Luis de Victoria –

Classical music

Opera
none listed

Births
March – Antonio Bertali, Italian composer (died 1669)
April – Giacomo Carissimi, composer  (died 1674)
April 19 – Orazio Benevoli, composer  (died 1672)
July 9 – Simon Dach, hymn-writer (died 1659)
September 17 – Francesco Sacrati, early opera composer (died 1650)
date unknown – Constantia Zierenberg, singer and musician (died 1653)
probable
Johann Vierdanck, violinist, cornettist, and composer  (died 1646)
Julius Johann Weiland, composer (died 1663)

Deaths
February 19 – Orazio Vecchi, Italian composer (born 1550)
September 24 – Manuel Mendes, composer and music teacher (born c. 1547)
date unknown – Pedro Bermúdez, composer and chapel-master (born 1558)

References

 
Music
17th century in music
Music by year